Aleluia is the thirteenth album in the live praise and worship series of contemporary worship music by Diante do Trono.

Background 

In the pre-recording of the Aleluia, the mining group released the Tua Visão album, recorded at the Station Square, in Belo Horizonte.

Aleluia was recorded with an audience of over 60,000 in the arena and over 150,000 people present. It was recorded at the Cowboy Park Barretos in Barretos, on July 17, 2010.

The album sold more than 230,000 copies so getting Triple Platinum Disc was the best-selling gospel album of 2010. Charting hits in churches throughout Brazil as "Aleluia", "Oleiro", "Me Refaz" and "Canção do Apocalipse".

Track listings

CD

DVD

References 

2010 live albums
2010 video albums
Live video albums
Portuguese-language live albums
Diante do Trono video albums
Diante do Trono live albums